Gaetano Apolline Baldassarre Vestris (18 April 1729 – 1808), French ballet dancer, was born in Florence and made his debut at the opera in 1749.

Life
Born of an Italian theatrical family, he studied dance with Louis Dupré at the Royal Academy in Paris, later joining the Paris Opéra where he served as dancing master to Louis XVI. Vestris was the first dancer to discard the mask and to use his face in mime.	

By 1751, his success and his vanity had grown to such a point that he is reported to have said, "There are but three great men in Europe—the king of Prussia, Voltaire and I." He was an excellent mimic as well as dancer. From 1770 to 1776 he was a master and composer of ballets, retiring, in favour of Jean Georges Noverre, with a pension.

Vestris married a dancer, Anna Heinel (1753–1808), of German origin, who had a wonderful success at the opera. He reappeared at the age of seventy-one on the occasion of his grandson's debut.

Family
Gaetano had several children who also became dancers. He was the lover of French ballerina Marie Allard and their son Auguste Vestris (1760–1842) was also considered the greatest male dancer of his time. 
Auguste made his debut at 12 with the Paris Opéra and was the company's leading dancer for 36 years. Auguste's son, Auguste Armand Vestris (1788–1825), husband of Lucia Elizabeth Vestris, took to the same profession and made his debut at the opera in 1800, but left Paris for England, Italy and Vienna never reappearing in France. Gaetano's brother, Angiolo Vestris (1730–1809), formerly a dancer and later an actor at the Comédie-Italienne, married Marie Rose Gourgaud, the sister of the actor Dugazon. Gaetano and Angiolo's sister, Thérèse (1726-1808), was also a dancer.

References

Attribution:

1729 births
1808 deaths
People from Florence
Italian emigrants to France
French male ballet dancers
French ballet masters
18th-century French ballet dancers
Paris Opera Ballet étoiles
Paris Opera Ballet artistic directors
Burials at Montmartre Cemetery
Vestris family